Paul Migy (14 September 1814, in Porrentruy – 1 April 1879) was a Swiss politician from the Canton of Bern and President of the Swiss Council of States (1851) and National Council (1857).

External links 

1814 births
1879 deaths
People from Porrentruy
Swiss Roman Catholics
Free Democratic Party of Switzerland politicians
Members of the Council of States (Switzerland)
Presidents of the Council of States (Switzerland)
Members of the National Council (Switzerland)
Presidents of the National Council (Switzerland)
Federal Supreme Court of Switzerland judges
19th-century Swiss politicians
19th-century Swiss judges